Salomon Soldin (15 March 1774 - 27 November 1837) was a Jewish-Danish bookseller, publisher, editor, writer and translator.

Early life and background
Soldin was born into a Jewish family in Copenhagenm the son of  Israel Isak Soldin, a merchant, and Malka (née Isserl)m who had emigrated to Denmark from Germany. He had four brothers and four sisters.

Career
Salomon Soldin trained as a bookseller with his elder brother Abraham Soldin (1769–1834) and became a partner in the company in an early age. A third brother was the antique book seller Hartvig Soldin (1763–1843). The brothers Salomon and Abraham Soldin created a publishing house of considerable size. Their publications included H. A. Kofod's first encyclopedia which was published in 20 volumes from 1816, a popular series of travel books (34 volumes) and many school books.

Soldin was editor of the journal Nyeste Skilderie af Kjøbenhavn from 1804–25 and its publisher from 1811. He wrote many of the articles himself while other contributors included Rasmus Nyerup, Knud Lyhne Rahbek, N.F.S. Grundtvig and Christian Molbech.

Personal life
Soldin married  Hanne Ruben (16 January 1775 - 15 November). She was the daughter of merchant in Helsingør Ephraim Magnus Ruben (1732–1813) and Sara Ruben née Moses (c. 1746 – 1815). The couple had no children.

Philanthropy
Salomon  and Hanne Soldin founded the charity  Salomon Soldin og hustru Hanne Soldins stiftelse in their will. It purchased Trøstens Bolig at Skindergade 34 in Copenhagen in 1854, converting it into a home for indigent widows and unmarried women of the middle class.

References

External links

19th-century Danish publishers (people)
Danish editors
Danish booksellers
Danish writers
Writers from Copenhagen
Businesspeople from Copenhagen
1774 births
1837 deaths
Danish Jews